Jefferson Township is a township in Wayne County, Iowa, USA.

History
Jefferson Township is named for Thomas Jefferson.

References

Townships in Wayne County, Iowa
Townships in Iowa